Everything I've Got in My Pocket is the debut album by actor and singer Minnie Driver, and was released in 2004. The tracks "Everything I've Got in My Pocket" and "Invisible Girl" were released as singles. In the US, the album reached  43 on Billboards "Top Heatseekers" chart.

Track listing
All songs were written by Driver, except where noted.
 "Everything I've Got in My Pocket" - 3:40
 "Invisible Girl" (Marc Dauer, Driver, Jeff Trott) - 3:35
 "Fast as You Can" - 4:14
 "Wire" - 4:59
 "Home" - 3:53
 "Deeper Water" - 5:25
 "So Well" - 3:57
 "Hungry Heart" (Bruce Springsteen) - 4:09
 "Down" - 4:36
 "Yellow Eyes" - 5:03
 "Ruby Adeline" - 2:43

Trivia
The song "Deeper Water" was featured at the end of the Smallville episode "Pariah".

References

Minnie Driver albums
2004 debut albums
Zoë Records albums
Liberty Records albums